Pieter Jan Hagens (born 14 August 1958) is a Dutch radio and television presenter.

Career 

He is known for presenting EenVandaag, Jules Unlimited and Buitenhof. He also presented the radio program Spijkers met Koppen.

Between 2008 and 2011 he presented the popular television show Wie is de Mol?. Art Rooijakkers succeeded him as presenter of the show.

In 2016, he won the 15th edition of the De Grote Geschiedenisquiz together with Jort Kelder.

Filmography

As presenter 

 2008 – 2011: Wie is de Mol?

As contestant 

 2016: De Grote Geschiedenisquiz

References

External links

 

1958 births
Living people
Dutch television presenters
Dutch radio presenters